Rinaldo di Calvi was an Italian Renaissance painter.

Born in Calvi dell'Umbria, he learned the craft from his father, Pancrazio Jacobetti. His works are influenced by the painter Lo Spagna. Documents show he painted a gonfalone for the city of Foglia. In 1521, he painted an altarpiece for the chapel of Sant'Antonio di Padova for the Convent of San Bernardo. In 1523, he painted for the church of Santa Maria delle Grazie in Calvi, where he met the painter Benvenuto da Vasciano. He is best known for his large altarpiece of the Coronation of the Virgin for the sacristy of the church of San Nicolo in Stroncone (Terni).

He likely died from the plague circa 1528.

References

Year of birth unknown
Year of death unknown
16th-century Italian painters
Italian male painters
Umbrian painters
People from Terni